Dohm is a surname. Notable people with the surname include:

 Christian Wilhelm von Dohm (1751–1820), Prussian Christian diplomat, historian, advocate of the Jews
 Ernst Dohm (1819–1883), originally Elias Levy Dohm, pseudonym Karlchen Mießnick, German Jewish editor, actor, translator
 Gaby Dohm (born 1943), Austrian actress
 Hedwig Dohm (1831–1919), German Jewish actress, feminist, wife of Ernst Dohm
 Walter Dohm (1869–1894), American runner
 Will Dohm (1897-1948), German actor
 Hedwig Pringsheim (1855–1942), born Dohm, a German actress, daughter of Ernst and Hedwig Dohm

See also
Dohm-Mann family tree
Daum (disambiguation)